Mammad Yusif Jafarov Hajibaba oghlu (March 14, 1885 - May 15, 1938) was an Azerbaijani statesman.

Early life
Jafarov was born on March 14, in Baku, in the Baku Governorate of the Russian Empire (present-day Azerbaijan). He was the younger brother of a prominent professor and journalist, Ali Isgender Jafarzadeh. After completion of his secondary education, Jafarov studied in at Moscow State University graduating with a cum laude degree in law in 1912. While in Moscow, he was one of the organizers of regular ethnic Azerbaijani concerts and co-founders of Azerbaijani diaspora organizations.

Political career

Russian Empire
In 1912, when Fourth Duma of Russian Empire convened in Saint Petersburg, Mammad Yusif Jafarov was elected by the Muslim population of Baku, Ganja and Erivan governorates to represent them in state parliament. In Saint Petersburg, he joined Constitutional Democratic Party (also known as Kadets). While in the Duma, he repeatedly criticized Tsar's government for their unjust colonization policy in Azerbaijan. On March 9, immediately after Russia's February Revolution, the interim government established the Transcaucasian Committee of the Duma. Jafarov was one of the members of the committee that managed the industrial and economic operations. On November 15, 1917, he was appointed Commissar of Industry and Trade of Transcaucasian Commissariat.

Azerbaijan Democratic Republic
When Azerbaijan Democratic Republic was proclaimed on May 28, 1918, Jafarov was appointed the Minister of Industry and Trade within the new Cabinet of Azerbaijan established by Prime Minister Fatali Khan Khoyski. When the first cabinet was dissolved, he left his post and later served as a diplomatic representative of Azerbaijan in the Georgian government. On March 14, 1919, Jafarov was appointed Minister of Foreign Affairs of Azerbaijan by the new government of Prime Minister Nasib Yusifbeyli. Jafarov is credited for his extensive work in disseminating information about Azerbaijan in the international community. In October 1919, he joined the Musavat party. In December of the same year, Jafarov resigned as the cabinet of Yusifbeyli dissolved. In February 1920, he was appointed Deputy Speaker of Parliament of Azerbaijan. Due to the absence of the Speaker Alimardan Topchubashov who was at the Versailles Peace Conference and eventually achieved the de facto recognition of Azerbaijan Democratic Republic in January by the Council of Allied Powers, Jafarov served as the acting speaker and head of government until April 27, 1920, when Azerbaijan was occupied by Bolshevik 11th Red Army and ADR ceased to exist. He signed the documents of the peaceful surrender of the Azerbaijani government to the Bolsheviks.

Soviet Azerbaijan
During the Soviet rule of Azerbaijan SSR, Jafarov retired from politics and worked as a legal counselor at Azerbaijani wine-making and cotton-wool trusts. He died on May 15, 1938, in Baku.

See also
Minister of Foreign Affairs of Azerbaijan
Azerbaijan Democratic Republic
Azerbaijani National Council

References

1885 births
1938 deaths
Politicians from Baku
People from Baku Governorate
Azerbaijani nobility
Members of the 4th State Duma of the Russian Empire
Russian Constituent Assembly members
Ministers of Foreign Affairs of Azerbaijan
Members of the National Assembly of the Azerbaijan Democratic Republic
Diplomats from Baku
Lawyers from Baku
Moscow State University alumni
20th-century Azerbaijani lawyers